The following is a list of the national television and radio networks and announcers that have broadcast American League Championship Series games over the years. It does include any announcers who may have appeared on local broadcasts produced by the participating teams.

National television

2020s

2010s

Notes
2011 – Terry Francona filled for Tim McCarver for the first two games of Fox's coverage during the ALCS because McCarver was recovering from a minor heart procedure.
Beginning in 2014, when Fox Sports began a new television contract with Major League Baseball, FS1 airs 40 regular season MLB games (mostly on Saturdays), along with up to 15 post-season games (eight Divisional Series games and one best-of-7 League Championship Series). The deal resulted in a reduction of MLB coverage on the Fox network, which will air 12 regular season games, the All-Star Game, and the World Series.
2014 – Mike Bordick, a color analyst for the Orioles' regular-season telecasts, and Steve Physioc, a play-by-play man for the Royals' TV/radio broadcasts, were employed as field-level commentators for TBS' coverage along with Matt Winer.
 The start of Game 1 was delayed by four minutes due to floodlights from TBS' pre-game show set not being turned off in time.
2016 – Sportsnet, a property of Toronto Blue Jays owner Rogers Communications, aired all games in Canada using the TBS feeds.
2018 – Brian Anderson took over for Ernie Johnson as the lead play-by-play man for TBS, after Johnson dropped out of TBS’ postseason coverage entirely after announcing that he had been diagnosed with blood clots in both of his legs. Anderson would’ve taken Johnson's place anyway due to the latter's Inside the NBA duties for TNT.
2019 – Joe Davis called play-by-play for Game 4 due to Joe Buck calling Thursday Night Football for Fox.

2000s

Notes
Game 6 of the 2000 ALCS is the last baseball game that NBC televised until a game between the Boston Red Sox and Chicago White Sox on May 8, 2022. In Houston, due to the coverage of the 2000 U.S. presidential debates, KPRC-TV elected to carry NBC News' coverage of the debate while KNWS-TV carried NBC's final baseball game.
In , Game 5 of the NLCS and Game 4 of the ALCS were split between Fox and Fox Sports Net. This came off the heels of Fox airing an NFL doubleheader that particular day (October 21).
In , Game 1 of the NLCS and Game 2 of the ALCS were split between Fox and Fox Sports Net. The regional split was done in order for Fox to avoid televising a weekday afternoon game.
In , Game 1 of the ALCS and Game 2 of the NLCS were split between Fox and FX.
In , Game 1 of the NLCS and Game 2 of the ALCS were split between Fox and Fox Sports Net. Also in 2004, Game 5 of the ALCS ran way into the time slot of Game 5 of the NLCS. As a result, the first seven innings of the NLCS game were shown on FX.
In , Game 1 of the NLCS and Game 1 of the ALCS were split between Fox and FX.
Game 2 of the 2006 ALCS was originally intended to air on FX, but the NLCS game that night (originally intended to air on Fox) was rained out. FX showed the movie Any Given Sunday instead.
In , Fox fired Steve Lyons from their baseball coverage altogether following what they saw insensitive comments made about Hispanics during the Game 3 broadcast. During Game 3, Lyons' broadcast colleague Lou Piniella, who is of Spanish descent, made an analogy involving the luck of finding a wallet, and then briefly used a couple of Spanish phrases. Lyons responded by saying that Piniella was "hablaing Espanol" -- Spanglish for "speaking Spanish"—and added, "I still can't find my wallet. I don't understand him, and I don't want to sit close to him now."
On October 18, 2008, TBS missed most of the first inning of Game 6 of that year's American League Championship Series, with viewers getting a rerun of The Steve Harvey Show instead. TBS picked up the game just prior to the last out in the bottom of the first, with announcer Chip Caray apologizing to viewers for "technical difficulties".
Although not an active field reporter during Fox's coverage of the 2009 ALCS, Kenny Albert still presided over the championship presentation and postgame interviews in the pennant winning New York Yankees' clubhouse.

1990s

Notes
The  postseason started on a Thursday, while World Series started on a Tuesday due to the brief lockout.
In , CBS didn't come on the air for baseball for weeknight LCS telecasts until 8:30 p.m. ET. Instead, they opted to show programming such as Rescue 911 at 8 p.m. rather than a baseball pregame show.
Throughout Game 2 of the 1992 ALCS, Jim Kaat was stricken with a bad case of laryngitis. As a result, Johnny Bench had to come over from the CBS Radio booth and finish the game with Dick Stockton as a "relief analyst." There was talk that if Kaat's laryngitis did not get better, Don Drysdale was going to replace Kaat on television for the rest of ALCS, while Bench would continue to work on CBS Radio.
CBS' coverage of the 1992 LCS led to conflicts with the presidential debates that year. CBS didn't cover one of the debates because Game 4 of the ALCS, went into extra innings. By the time it ended, the debate was almost over.
The 1994 American League Championship Series was planned to air on NBC. However, those plans were scrapped when a strike caused the entire postseason to be canceled.
The rather messy  arrangement was courtesy of "The Baseball Network", which was Major League Baseball's in-house production facility. ABC and NBC (who essentially, distributed the telecasts rather than produce them by themselves like in the past) shared the same on-air graphics and even the microphone "flags" had the "Baseball Network" logo on it with the respective network logo. In addition, the first four games of both of the 1995 League Championship Series were regionally televised.

1980s

Notes
 marked the last year that the local flagship television stations for the competing teams were allowed to produce their own League Championship Series broadcasts. Bill Macatee hosted the pregame shows with analyst Don Sutton for NBC.
Had the 1984 ALCS between the Detroit Tigers and Kansas City Royals gone the full five games (the last year that the League Championship Series was a best-of-five series), Game 5 on Sunday October 7, would have been a 1 p.m. ET time start instead of being in prime time. This would have happened because one of the presidential debates between Ronald Reagan and Walter Mondale was scheduled for that night. In return, ABC was going to broadcast the debates instead of a baseball game in prime time.
Al Trautwig interviewed the Detroit Tigers from their clubhouse following their pennant clinching victory in Game 3.
Dick Enberg was in Toronto for Games 1 and 7 of the 1985 ALCS on NBC. Enberg hosted the pregame show alongside Rick Dempsey (who was still active with Baltimore at the time). Meanwhile, Bill Macatee provided a report on Game 2 of the ALCS during the pregame of the NLCS opener.
CTV in Canada simulcast NBC's coverage (albeit with Canadian commercials) of the 1985 ALCS involving the Toronto Blue Jays. In 1985, many relied on cable and antennas. Therefore, carts of Canada not near the USA border couldn't pick up the American feeds, hence why these feeds were needed.
On October 15, Game 6 of the 1986 NLCS ran so long (lasting for 16 innings, 5 hours, and 29 minutes), it bumped up against the start time of Game 7 of the ALCS (also on ABC). In his last ABC assignment, Don Drysdale interviewed the winners in the Boston clubhouse following Game 7 of the 1986 ALCS.
NBC used Don Sutton as a pre and postgame analyst for their 1987 LCS coverage. Marv Albert went back-and-forth during both 1987 LCS. He hosted the pregame for Game 1 of the NLCS with Joe Morgan from St. Louis. He then went to Minnesota the next night to host the ALCS pregame with Don Sutton. Sutton also made an appearance in the booth during Game 3 of the ALCS. Sutton talked with Bob Costas and Tony Kubek about Twins pitcher Les Straker's borderline balk in that game. Sutton later interviewed Detroit Tigers manager Sparky Anderson following their loss in Game 5.
Then Texas Rangers manager Bobby Valentine worked as an on-the-field analyst for NBC's 1989 ALCS coverage.
Jimmy Cefalo hosted the pregame show for Game 4 of the 1989 ALCS as Marv Albert was away on an NFL assignment for NBC.

1970s

Notes
In , NBC televised the second games of both League Championship Series on a regional basis. Some markets got the NLCS at 1 p.m. ET along with a 4 p.m. NFL game while other markets got the ALCS at 4 p.m. along with a 1 p.m. NFL game.
In , Game 1 of the ALCS was rained out on Saturday, October 2. Due to its NFL coverage, NBC did not televise the rescheduled Game 1 the following day (they had only planned an NLCS telecast that day), but added a telecast of Game 2 on Monday, October 4 (which had been a scheduled travel day).
NBC did not air Game 2 of the 1973 ALCS.
Game 3 of both League Championship Series were aired in prime time, the first time such an occurrence happened.
 marked the first time that all LCS games were televised nationally. Keith Jackson missed Game 1 of the ALCS because he had just gotten finished calling the Oklahoma vs. Texas college football game for ABC. Thus, Bob Uecker filled-in for Jackson for Game 1. Uecker also took part in the postgame interviews for Game 5 of the 1976 ALCS, while Warner Wolf did an interview of George Brett in the Kansas City locker room.
In , Keith Jackson called an Oklahoma vs. Texas college football game for ABC on October 7, and then flew to New York, arriving just in time to call Game 4 of the ALCS that same night.

1969

Notes
In the early years of the League Championship Series, NBC typically televised a doubleheader on the opening Saturday, followed by a single game on Sunday (because of NFL coverage). They then covered the weekday games with a 1.5 hour overlap, joining the second game in progress when the first one ended. NBC usually swapped announcer crews after Game 2.
NBC did not air Game 2 of the 1969 ALCS.
So in 1969, for example, Orioles fans in Baltimore could choose to watch either the NBC telecast or Chuck Thompson, Bill O'Donnell and Jim Karvellas on WJZ-TV.

Surviving telecasts
For all of the League Championship Series telecasts spanning from 1969 to 1975, only Game 2 of the 1972 American League Championship Series (Oakland vs. Detroit) is known to exist. However, the copy on the trade circuit of Game 2 of the 1972 ALCS is missing the Bert Campaneris–Lerrin LaGrow brawl. There are some instances where the only brief glimpse of telecast footage of an early LCS game can be seen in a surviving newscast from that night. For instance, the last out of the 1973 National League Championship Series as described by Jim Simpson was played on that night's NBC Nightly News, but other than that, the entire game is gone. On the day the New York Mets and Baltimore Orioles wrapped up their respective League Championship Series in 1969, a feature story on the CBS Evening News showed telecast clips of the ALCS game (there's no original sound, just voiceover narration). This is all that likely remains of anything from that third game of the Orioles–Twins series. Simpson's call of the injury of Reggie Jackson during Game 5 of the 1972 ALCS is heard on the 1972 World Series film, as well as Curt Gowdy's call of the home run by Johnny Bench in Game 5 of the 1972 NLCS as well as Bob Moose throwing a wild pitch to pinch-hitter Hal McRae scoring George Foster with the winning run.

Local television
As previously mentioned, from 1969 until 1983, the Major League Baseball television contract allowed a local TV station in the market of each competing team to also carry the LCS games.

1970s

National radio
From 1969 to 1975, there was no official national radio network coverage of the League Championship Series. NBC only had the national radio rights to the All-Star Game and World Series during this period. Instead, national coverage was provided by local team radio broadcasts being syndicated nationally over ad hoc networks.

2020s

2010s

2000s

1990s

See also
List of Major League Baseball on ESPN Radio broadcasters

1980s

1970s

Notes
1972, 1973 and 1975 were years in which the participants' local broadcasts were syndicated.

1969

Local radio
From 1969 to present, with the exception of the period between 1969 and 1975, the non-National radio broadcasts of the American League Championship Series we're broadcast on the flagship station and the radio network of the teams participating in the American League Championship Series.

2010s

2000s

1990s

Notes
1992 ALCS – Locally, the series was called on CJCL-AM in Toronto by Tom Cheek and Jerry Howarth and KSFO-AM in Oakland by Bill King, Lon Simmons, and Ray Fosse.
1993 ALCS – Locally, the series was called on CJCL-AM in Toronto by Tom Cheek and Jerry Howarth and WMAQ-AM in Chicago by John Rooney and Ed Farmer.

1980s

1970s

References

External links
League Championship Series Video
Major League Baseball Playoff Ratings, 1976-2007
Searchable Network TV Broadcasts
HERE IS HOW TV COVERED THE LEAGUE CHAMPIONSHIP SERIES IN THE EARLY YEARS
Episode List: MLB ALCS - TV Tango

Broadcasters
+ALCS
ABC Sports
CBS Sports
Major League Baseball on Fox
Major League Baseball on NBC
Turner Sports
Major League Baseball on the radio
ESPN Radio
CBS Radio Sports
Local sports television programming in the United States
Fox Sports announcers
ESPN announcers